Clinidium apertum is a species of ground beetle in the subfamily Rhysodinae. It was described by Edmund Reitter in 1880. It is endemic to the eastern United States.

Clinidium apertum measure  in length.

References

Clinidium
Beetles of the United States
Endemic fauna of the United States
Beetles described in 1880
Taxa named by Edmund Reitter